Wilbur Myers (born August 17, 1961) is a former American football defensive back. He played for the Denver Broncos in 1983.

References

1961 births
Living people
American football defensive backs
Delta State Statesmen football players
Denver Broncos players
People from Jefferson Davis County, Mississippi